Hasan Madan (born 29 February 1996) is a Bahraini handball player for Al-Ahli and the Bahraini national team.

He represented Bahrain at the 2019 World Men's Handball Championship.

References

1996 births
Living people
Bahraini male handball players
Asian Games medalists in handball
Asian Games silver medalists for Bahrain
Medalists at the 2018 Asian Games
Handball players at the 2018 Asian Games
21st-century Bahraini people